By the mid 2022, China operated 25 GW of offshore wind power.

In June 2021, it was 7.9 GW. 16.9 GW was constructed during 2021.

The World Forum Offshore wind (WFO) has concluded the 2021 global report. A full list of worldwide wind farms installed in 2021 it is shown in the report among other statistics. Link to WFO global report: https://wfo-global.org/wp-content/uploads/2022/09/WFO_Global-Offshore-Wind-Report-HY1-2022.pdf

List
This is a list of operational offshore wind farms in China (within the national maritime boundaries) with a capacity of at least 100 MW. 
The name of the wind farm is the name used by the energy company when referring to the farm. It is usually related to a shoal or the name of the nearest town on shore.

See also

Wind power in China
List of wind farms
List of offshore wind farms
Lists of offshore wind farms by country
Lists of offshore wind farms by water area

References

External links
 LORC Offshore Renewables Map - China

China
 
Power stations in Hong Kong
.Wind